Ronald Charles Fellows CM (born September 28, 1959) is a Canadian auto racing driver. Fellows holds the record for most wins by a foreign-born driver in NASCAR's top three series (Sprint Cup, Nationwide, and trucks) with six – four in Nationwide and two in trucks.

Personal life
Fellows was born in Windsor, Ontario, on September 28, 1959. At age four he became interested in auto racing with his family. He found a love for French-Canadian Formula 1 driver Gilles Villeneuve. Fellows has one of the biggest collections of Gilles Villeneuve merchandise in Canada and called Villeneuve his idol. To attend F1 races at a young age, Fellows went to watch them at a local track on an island in Montreal, Canada; a track that eventually would be named "Circuit Gilles Villeneuve". When Villeneuve died in 1982 the track was named after Villeneuve himself. Fellows developed a dream to win at Circuit Gilles Villeneuve when he became a racing driver. He accomplished his goal in 2008, winning the NASCAR Nationwide Series race at the track, the NAPA Auto Parts 200.

Besides his racing career, Fellows owns a corporate business chain, the Ron Fellows Performance Driving Schools, and is one of the owners of car brand Corvette as well as Corvette's racing operations. He also owns a charity called the Sunoco-Ron Fellows Karting Championship, to help young kids become race-car drivers. In January 2013, Ron Fellows purchased the Canadian Tire Motorsports Park racetrack and NASCAR hosted a truck series race there-the first time since 2000 that the truck series came to a road course. Fellows' current goal for his track is to bring the Cup Series to the track someday.

Fellows is married to Lynda Fellows and has three kids: Lyndsay, Sam, and Patrick Fellows. Ron is a close friend of Dale Earnhardt Jr., whom he has previously driven for in the NASCAR Nationwide Series. Jacques Villeneuve, who was a student in a racing school with Fellows, is also a close friend.

Early career

Fellows began his career in karts, which led to Formula Ford 1600 and Formula Ford 2000. When funds for these projects ran low, he left racing for a nine-year stint as gas pipeline worker. Fellows returned to the track in the 1980s with help from driving school instructor Richard Spenard. He made his professional debut in 1986 in the Player's GM Challenge, driving a showroom stock Chevrolet Camaro.

Sports car racing

Fellows had a dominant 1989 season, capturing both the title at Mosport Park and his first SCCA Trans-Am Series race during the same weekend. His career improved as he became one of the most successful drivers in the history of Trans Am, with 19 wins in 95 starts.

Fellows then had two starts in the legendary Ferrari 333SP, including a 1997 win at Mosport Park in the IMSA GT Championship.

1998–2001
In 1998, Fellows began his long association with GM's Corvette Racing program, with the historic Chevrolet Corvette C5R. He was also briefly involved with the development of the Cadillac LMP program. At the 2000 Rolex 24 at Daytona, he made history by setting the closest margin of victory in the history of the event, 31 seconds behind the winning Dodge Viper GTS-R of Olivier Beretta, Dominique Dupuy and Karl Wendlinger. Fellows and Corvette Racing fared better the next year, winning overall with Chris Kneifel, Johnny O'Connell, and Franck Fréon. Later that year, in June, Corvette Racing achieved its ultimate goal, a GTS class win in the 24 Hours of Le Mans, with Scott Pruett and O'Connell. Corvette Racing also captured the American Le Mans Series GTS title that same year.

2002–2004
In 2002, the Corvette C5R once again dominated the American Le Mans Series season, with a GTS class win at the 12 Hours of Sebring, along with a repeat of their 24 Hours of Le Mans GTS class victory. For the 2003 season, Corvette Racing won the American Le Mans Series GTS title with a very close win over the Prodrive Ferrari 550 team. In 2004 Corvette Racing continued to dominate the American Le Mans Series GTS class, including another GTS class win at the 12 Hours of Sebring. Fellows also competed in one NASCAR Cup Series race, at Watkins Glen, where he started 43rd and climbed his way up to second place.

2005
In 2005, Corvette Racing debuted the revolutionary Chevrolet Corvette C6R, at the 12 Hours of Sebring, with high expectations. A tire blow out erased their chances of capturing the GT1 (formerly GTS) win, with the Prodrive Aston Martin DBR9 taking the class win. However, later that year, Corvette Racing won their third 24 Hours of Le Mans class title in six years, beating the Aston Martin DBR9s with superior reliability and strategy. Although Fellows was not driving the winning Chevrolet Corvette C6R, he ran a respectable race in the No. 63 car.

2006
In 2006, Fellows returned for a full season with Corvette Racing. However, controversy surrounded the 2006 season as a result of   IMSA's performance balancing. Corvette Racing's opposition during 2006 was the Prodrive Aston Martin team, which ran two full-season cars on Pirelli tires. The Pirelli tires were their undoing, as they were not as competitive as the Michelin tires on the Corvettes. Prodrive expressed their disdain for their disadvantage, and IMSA, the ALMS sanctioning body, introduced a number of penalties for the Corvette Racing team, to "balance" the performance. Despite this controversy, Fellows remained optimistic and still carried himself with the professionalism and class for which he is known. Despite the penalties, Corvette Racing prevailed, winning their fifth ALMS championship. Corvette Racing also won their fourth 24 Hours of Le Mans in six years. However, Fellows did not have the best luck in 2006, with the title going to the sister car driven by Jan Magnussen, Olivier Beretta and Oliver Gavin.

2007
Fellows returned to Corvette Racing in a limited supporting role in the American Le Mans Series. He was the third driver for the three long-distance races, and competed at Mosport, his home race. He sat out the other races, providing technical input and experienced advice to the team from behind the wall.

NASCAR 
Fellows has had various stints in the NASCAR Camping World Truck Series, Nationwide Series, and Sprint Cup Series, as a "road course ringer". He has two wins and three poles in the Camping World Truck Series, winning twice at Watkins Glen. He has had even greater success in the NASCAR Nationwide Series, where he has four wins and two poles in six starts. He was also the first non-American to win a NASCAR Nationwide Series event. As of November 22, 2011, Fellows held the record for most wins by a foreign-born driver in NASCAR's top three series (Sprint Cup, Nationwide, and trucks) with six – four in Nationwide and two in trucks.

Fellows made his NASCAR Cup Series debut in 1995 driving the No. 68 Chevy for Canaska Motorsports, owned by Victor Sifton. After he performed awfully during the race, Fellows stepped down from Cup racing to drive a part-time stint in the Craftsman Truck Series. Fellows did not return to the Cup series until 1998, driving the No. 96 Caterpillar Chevy for American Equipment Racing and Buzz McCall. Starting second alongside Jeff Gordon, Ron Fellows had a promising start in the race, until he broke down from axle issues on lap 12, due to an oversight by a pit crew member, causing him to enter the garages for repairs and finish 42nd. He also ran an oval race in the same car-at Loudon which happens to be his single race he's run that is not a road course. He finished 36th after starting dead last.

During the late 1990s, Fellows was a regular winner at Watkins Glen in the Truck Series, winning in 1997 and 1999. His first truck win in 1997 was for Billy Hess' No. 48 AER Manufacturing team and his last truck win in 1999 was for NEMCO Motorsports. A year after winning his first truck race, Ron Fellows won his first Busch series event on June 28, 1998, leading the most laps during the 1998 Lysol 200. After polesitter Boris Said spun on lap one, Fellows took the lead and led 54 of 82 laps. Fellows held off Michael McLaughlin to win the race. In 1999, Fellows nearly repeated the win but got passed by  Dale Earnhardt Jr. on the final lap. The following season, Fellows won the Lysol 200 again, holding off Corvette teammate Butch Leitzinger.

In August 1999, Fellows had his career-best finish at Watkins Glen, driving the No. 87 Chevy for Joe Nemechek. In his only scheduled NASCAR Cup Series race for 1999, for the Frontier at the Glen, Fellows led three laps, but was beaten by Gordon on the final restart. The following year, Fellows ran the Watkins Glen race again. Qualifying was cancelled because of rain and, because of a qualifying rule where NASCAR decided the remaining 8 positions by drawing, Fellows was controversially given the 40th starting spot over full-time drivers such as Scott Pruett and Dave Marcis (despite that Pruett and Marcis had faster cars than Fellows). Fellows would run in the top-15 in the race before suffering an engine failure on lap 23. Fellows returned to the No. 87 in 2001 driving both road courses. He had a promising run at Sears Point Raceway, in which he led the most laps but finished 38th after crashing with 14 laps to go. He later led three laps at Watkins Glen during the 2001 Global Crossing at the Glen but finished 42nd after breaking his axles on lap 30 of 90. His only start in 2002 was at Sears Point Raceway, in which he finished 25th in his last race for Joe Nemechek.

In 2000, Fellows was in talks with Dale Earnhardt about driving for Dale Earnhardt Inc. full-time after 2001. It appeared that the full-time deal was sealed but Earnhardt was killed during the 2001 Daytona 500 prior to  the agreement being fully consummated. In 2003 however, Fellows was remembered by Ty Norris, the DEI co-owner, and he was hired for the road races to drive the No. 1 car.

In 2003 at Infineon, during the Dodge/Save Mart 350, Fellows started third, and took advantage of a battle between Richard Childress Racing teammates Robby Gordon and Kevin Harvick to take the lead. Fellows led a lot of laps, and controlled the race with less than 70 laps to go. However Fellows had his hopes end after being called onto pit road just after a caution came out with 38 laps to go. Restarting 31st, Fellows finished seventh. Though Fellows has finished second twice at the Glen, Fellows stated in 2006 and 2013 that the 2003 Dodge Save-Mart 350 was the closest he had been to winning because he was dominant at Sonoma, while in the Watkins Glen finishes he lacked the proper speed.

In 2004, Fellows had one of his greatest performances. Because qualifying was cancelled due to rain, the lineup for the Watkins Glen event was decided by owner-points. Fellows started 43rd and finished second behind winner Tony Stewart. Fellows did challenge Stewart on the final restart but all of his speed was worn out by his charge through the field. The following season, Ron contested the 2005 Telcel Motorola 200 in Mexico City, for the inaugural Busch Series race there, driving the No. 87 NEMCO Motorsports Chevy. He ended up finishing 41st after blowing an engine early on.

In 2005 and 2006, Fellows drove the No. 32 car for Cal Wells and PPI Motorsports at Infineon and Watkins Glen. After starting 43rd at Sonoma he finished eighth. In 2006, Fellows had originally finished 10th during the AMD at the Glen, but was penalized 30 seconds, hours after the race ended, for having illegally made passes through the "bus stop". The Tide team later closed up shop after the year was over, throwing Fellows out of his part-time ride.

In 2007, Fellows joined Hall of Fame Racing as driver for the road races. In a similar performance to the 2003 Infineon race, Fellows led a bit of the race after passing in a three-wide move, and lost the lead after having to pit during a caution. Fellows finished 15th. After starting 26th at Watkins Glen, Fellows moved up to fourth. Fellows probably would have had a shot at the win had he not gotten a speeding on pit road penalty on lap 55 and had to restart 40th. But in a challenging rough drive through the field, Fellows finished fourth.

During 2006 and 2007, Fellows drove the No. 33 Busch series car for Kevin Harvick Incorporated, driving the road course races in Mexico City, Montreal, and Watkins Glen. In 2006, Fellows led one lap in Mexico City, but finished 33rd after blowing a radiator with less than 10 laps to go. Fellows picked up a top ten at Watkins Glen, finishing 9th. In 2007, Fellows renewed his deal for one more year to drive for Kevin Harvick Inc. in the No. 33 for the NBS road course events. In Mexico, Fellows did not have a promising race, finishing 33rd after blowing an engine with less than 15 laps to go.

At the first NBS race at Montreal, he drove a good race, starting 3rd in the No. 33 Camping World.com car. After spinning out with less than nine laps to go, Fellows mounted his best drive of the race during the final green-white-checkered finish attempt; he drove from 14th place to fourth place in two laps. His boss, Kevin Harvick, ended up winning the race because of Robby Gordon and rookie Marcos Ambrose's altercation. The next week, at Watkins Glen, he controlled the race early, leading 11 laps, but ended up 24th after tangling with fellow road ringer Scott Pruett on the final lap.

In 2008, Fellows only raced in one event, driving his first race for JR Motorsports. Fellows, in his only start of 2008, won a rain-shortened NAPA Auto Parts 200 at Circuit Gilles Villeneuve in the No. 5 car at Montreal. He won after Marcos Ambrose was black-flagged for slipping across the soaked pit road too fast just before the red flag flew. This race made history as the first points paying race to be run on Goodyear rain tires. NASCAR races are generally postponed for rain. This victory marked Fellows' fourth NASCAR Nationwide Series win, all coming on road courses. This also tied him for first in the Nationwide Series for most road course wins. He is tied with Terry Labonte with four. Fellows was very emotional about his win because his lifelong childhood dream was to win a professional car race at Montreal since his childhood hero Gilles Villeneuve raced at the track when he watched from the stadium. As a result of his big win Fellows was given the No. 5 JR Motorsports crew for a multi-year deal. He drove for JR Motorsports through 2009 and 2010 for the road course races. Fellows did not have any promising races in 2009, but came back to the No. 88 team in 2010 to finish second at Road America. 

Fellows returned to JR Motorsports in 2011 for the road course races, driving the No. 7 AER car. He was in contention to win the Bucyrus 200 at Road America. He took the lead from Justin Allgaier, who had run out of fuel previously, passing Reed Sorenson in the process. However, NASCAR ruled that Fellows had passed both drivers under the caution flag too fast. Believing that Sorenson slowed due to also being out of fuel, Fellows drove past them at nearly race speed until he was leading the caution to the pace lap, though NASCAR rules stipulate that a driver must maintain reasonable speed while under the caution flag. As a result, Fellows was relegated to second place post-race, handing the win to Sorenson. Fellows said post-race that he should have won, although a year later, he admitted in a pre-race interview that NASCAR made the right call.

During 2010 and 2011, Fellows drove the No. 36 car for Tommy Baldwin Racing in the Cup series, but only at Watkins Glen. After running most of the 2010 Heluva Good at the Glen in the top twenty, Fellows suffered a blown engine and finished 40th. In 2011, Fellows only ran at Watkins Glen, driving the No. 36 Golden Corral car for Baldwin. Fellows wasn't much of a factor in the race. While running 25th on the final lap, Fellows got tangled in a final-lap crash involving David Ragan, and David Reutimann, crashing head-on into a barrier in the esses. He finished 30th.

The next year, Fellows could not land a ride for the Sprint Cup Series but ran the Nationwide Series road course races for JR Motorsports. Fellows led four laps at Road America and finished third. He finished fifth at Watkins Glen and fifth in Montreal. In 2013, Fellows ran his last race with JRM at the inaugural race in Mid-Ohio before parting ways with the team at year's end.

Fellows returned to the Cup Series in 2013. He drove the No. 33 car for Circle Sport Racing. His best finish was at Infineon Raceway, when he finished 22nd.

Other activities

GM created the Ron Fellows edition Corvette Z06 in 2007, with a signature trim package. It features unique white paint and "grand sport" hash marks on the front left fender.

Fellows also supports many charities and programs and, like many Canadians, he has a deep passion for hockey, especially the Toronto Maple Leafs. He lives outside of Toronto with his wife and three children, and has a second home in a town near Las Vegas because his driving school is based there.

On June 1, 2011, it was announced that Fellows, along with partners Carlo Fidani and Allan Boughton, had formed Canadian Motorsport Ventures Ltd., which had just completed the purchase of Mosport International Raceway, north of Bowmanville, Ontario, Canada.

On December 31, 2019, as part of the New Year Honours, Fellows was awarded the Order of Canada, for "outstanding work in multi-disciplinary roles in motor-racing".

Images

Motorsports career results

NASCAR
(key) (Bold – Pole position awarded by qualifying time. Italics – Pole position earned by points standings or practice time. * – Most laps led.)

Sprint Cup Series

Nationwide Series

Craftsman Truck Series

ARCA Bondo/Mar-Hyde Series
(key) (Bold – Pole position awarded by qualifying time. Italics – Pole position earned by points standings or practice time. * – Most laps led.)

24 Hours of Le Mans results

See also
 List of Canadians in NASCAR

References

External links

 
 

1959 births
Living people
Racing drivers from Ontario
Sportspeople from Windsor, Ontario
24 Hours of Daytona drivers
American Le Mans Series drivers
Trans-Am Series drivers
NASCAR drivers
Members of the Order of Canada
Dale Earnhardt Inc. drivers
24 Hours of Le Mans drivers
Corvette Racing drivers
JR Motorsports drivers